An Act to amend the Criminal Code (peremptory challenges) is an abbreviation of An Act to amend the Criminal Code, the Youth Criminal Justice Act and other Acts and to make consequential amendments to other Acts which was passed in June 2019 by the Canadian Parliament at Ottawa. It formerly was known as Bill C-75. Some (if not all) provisions of the Act came into force on 19 September 2019.

It made the headlines when Justice Andrew Goodman of the Ontario Superior Court at trial ruled that the Act had effectively infringed on an indigenous defendant's Charter Rights under Section 7. The first Trudeau administration had meant the Act to redress the power of defendants to dismiss potential jurors as part of their peremptory challenge rights granted as early as 1215 in the Magna Charta document. This was perceived by the Trudeau administration as needless discrimination and thus, in the 21st-century scramble to equalize society, needed to be stricken from collective memory. The need to rectify the law had become apparent to Liberal watchers of the death of Colten Boushie as a result of his 9 August 2016 trespass on the farm of Gerald Stanley, when they perceived racism to be evident in Stanley's 9 February 2018 acquittal. The OSC case is known as R v Dale King. A learned commentator wrote, before the 19 September implementation, that the elimination of peremptory challenges "defeats the intended purpose".

References

Canadian federal legislation
42nd Canadian Parliament
2019 in Canadian politics
Canadian criminal law
2019 in Canadian law
Canadian Charter of Rights and Freedoms
Human rights in Canada